Haram bin Milhan was a companion of the Islamic prophet Muhammad. During the Expedition of Bir Maona,  Muslims sent a messenger(Haram bin Milhan) with a letter of Muhammad to Amir bin Tufayl, the cousin of Abu Bara and the chief of Banu Amir. Amir did not read the Message but rather ordered a man to spear Haram bin Milhan in the back.

His uncle was also stabbed during the Expedition of Bir Maona.

See also
List of battles of Muhammad

References

Companions of the Prophet
Date of birth unknown
Date of death unknown
Place of birth unknown
Place of death unknown